

Margaret St. Clair (17 February  1911 – 22 November 1995) was an American fantasy and science fiction writer, who also wrote under the pseudonyms Idris Seabright and Wilton Hazzard.

Biography

St. Clair was born as Eva Margaret Neeley in Hutchinson, Kansas. Her father, US Representative George A. Neeley, died when Margaret was seven, but left her mother well provided for. With no siblings, Margaret recalled her childhood as "rather a lonely and bookish one." When she was seventeen, she and her mother moved to California. In 1932, after graduating from the University of California, Berkeley, she married writer Eric St. Clair. In 1934 she earned a Master of Arts in Greek Classics. The St. Clairs lived in a hilltop house with a panoramic view in what is now El Sobrante, California, where Margaret gardened; she also bred and sold dachshund puppies.

In her rare autobiographical writings, St. Clair revealed few details of her personal life, but interviews with some who knew her indicate that she and her husband were well-traveled (including some visits to nudist colonies), were childless by choice, and in 1966 were initiated into Wicca by Raymond Buckland, taking the Craft names Froniga and Weyland. Eric St. Clair worked variously as a statistician, social worker, horticulturist, shopfitter, and a laboratory assistant in the University of California at Berkeley Physics Department; he also published numerous short stories and magazine articles and was "perhaps the leading American writer of children's stories about bears, having sold close to 100 of them."

The St. Clairs eventually moved from El Sobrante to a house on the coast near Point Arena, "where every window had an ocean view." Margaret survived her husband by several years. A lifelong supporter of the American Friends Service Committee, she spent her final years at Friends House in Santa Rosa, California. She died in 1995.

Short stories

St. Clair wrote that she "first tried [her] hand at detective and mystery stories, and even the so-called 'quality' stories", before finding her niche writing fantasy and science fiction for pulp magazines. "Unlike most pulp writers, I have no special ambitions to make the pages of the slick magazines. I feel that the pulps at their best touch a genuine folk tradition and have a balladic quality which the slicks lack."

Beginning in the late 1940s, St. Clair wrote and published, by her own count, some 130 short stories. Her early output included the Oona and Jick series of eight stories published from 1947 to 1949, chronicling the comic misadventures of "housewife of the future" Oona and her devoted husband Jick. The stories were ostensibly set in an idealized future but cast a satirical look at post-war domestic life, with its focus on acquiring labor-saving household devices and "keeping up with the Joneses." St. Clair would later remark that the Oona and Jick stories "were not especially popular with fans, who were—then as now—a rather humorless bunch. The light tone of the stories seemed to offend readers and make them think I was making fun of them."

She was especially prolific in the 1950s, producing such acclaimed and much-reprinted stories as "The Man Who Sold Rope to the Gnoles" (1951), "Brightness Falls from the Air" (1951), "An Egg a Month from All Over" (1952), and "Horrer Howce" (1956).

Beginning in 1950 with "The Listening Child," all of St. Clair's stories in The Magazine of Fantasy and Science Fiction appeared under the pseudonym Idris Seabright. The Seabright story "Personal Monster" appeared in the September 1955 issue immediately before the story "Too Many Bears" by a newcomer to the magazine, St. Clair's husband, Eric; in his introductory note to "Too Many Bears", editor Anthony Boucher quipped that Eric St. Clair "is enviably married to two of my favorite science fiction writers."

Three of her short stories were adapted for television. "Mrs. Hawk" was filmed as "The Remarkable Mrs. Hawk" for the 1961 season of Thriller, with Jo Van Fleet in the title role. "The Boy Who Predicted Earthquakes" (1950) and "Brenda" (1954) were filmed as segments of the 1971 season of Rod Serling's Night Gallery.

St. Clair wrote only a handful of stories in the mystery genre, but one of them, The Perfectionist (1946), was widely reprinted and translated, and served as the basis for the play A Dash of Bitters by Reginald Denham and Conrad Sutton Smith. She also wrote several pieces of fiction and satire for "gentlemen's magazines" including Gent and The Dude.

Novels

St. Clair also wrote eight novels, four of which were published in the Ace Double series.

Sign of the Labrys (1963), set in a vast underground shelter after the world has been depopulated by plagues, featured an overt early use of Wicca elements in fiction; St. Clair wrote that the book "was primarily inspired by Gerald Gardner's books on witchcraft." The editor of The Crystal Well called Sign of the Labrys "an occult classic," and in his review of the novel for Analog, P. Schuyler Miller declared that St. Clair was one of the most unappreciated writers in science fiction. St. Clair's research into witchcraft led to her friendship with Raymond Buckland, who recalled the St. Clairs as "absolutely wonderful people, very warm and loving."

St. Clair's last three novels comprise a loose trilogy, all having in common a near-future setting along the coast of Northern California, and elements of Wicca. In The Dolphins of Altair (1967), dolphins and three human compatriots stage a war on mankind by creating earthquakes and polar melting. In The Shadow People (1969), a young male narrator in Berkeley descends into a mysterious underworld to rescue his abducted girlfriend. The Dancers of Noyo (1973) draws on Pomo lore as a young male narrator in a California largely depopulated by plague goes on a "Grail Journey" along Highway 101. In these last two novels, the narrator's quest climaxes in an experience of transcendent enlightenment.

Legacy

From the outset of her career, St. Clair was aware of her role as a woman writing in a male-dominated field. An article she wrote for Writer's Digest in 1947, about selling stories to the science fiction market, begins: "Why is science fiction fun to write? At first blush, it doesn't seem attractive, particularly for a woman." When the World Science Fiction Convention was held in Oakland in 1954, the Oakland Tribune highlighted St. Clair as a local author by asking her to provide a "menu of the future." The back cover of her 1963 paperback novel Sign of the Labrys declared in large capital letters, "Women Are Writing Science-Fiction!" and continued: "Women are closer to the primitive than men. They are conscious of the moon-pulls, the earth-tides. They possess a buried memory of humankind's obscure and ancient past which can emerge to uniquely color and flavor a novel. Such a woman is Margaret St. Clair…."

St. Clair's pioneering role as a woman writing science fiction was noted by Eric Leif Davin in his book Partners in Wonder: Women and the Birth of Science Fiction, 1926-1965.

The Margaret St. Clair Papers are archived at the University of California, Riverside.

Ramsey Campbell has described St. Clair's work as "startlingly original" and argues it has "yet to be fully appreciated".

Works

Novels
 The Green Queen (1956)
 Agent of the Unknown (1956)
 The Games of Neith (1960)
 Sign of the Labrys (1963)
 Message from the Eocene (1964)
 The Dolphins of Altair (1967)
 The Shadow People (1969)
 The Dancers of Noyo (1973)

Story collections
Three Worlds of Futurity (1964)
Change the Sky and Other Stories (1974)
The Best of Margaret St. Clair (1985)
The Hole in the Moon and Other Tales (2019)
A Compendium of Margaret St. Clair (2020) A collection of 62 of St. Clair's short stories.

Short stories (partial list)
 "The Perfectionist" (1946)
 "Rocket to Limbo" (1946)
 "Super Whost," an Oona and Jick story (1947)
 "The Boy Who Predicted Earthquakes" (1950)
 "Mrs. Hawk" (1950)
 "The Man Who Sold Rope to the Gnoles" (1951)
 "Brightness Falls from the Air" (1951)
  "The Bird" (1951)
 "An Egg a Month from All Over" (1952)
 "The Goddess on the Street Corner" (1953)
 "Brenda" (1954)
 "Personal Monster" (1955) 
  "Horrer Howce" (1956) 
 "Lochinvar" (Galaxy Science Fiction, August 1961)
 "An Old Fashioned Bird Christmas" (Galaxy, December 1961)
 "Roberta" (Galaxy, October 1962)

References

External links
Margaret St. Clair Papers archived at The University of California, Riverside.
 includes a lengthy bibliography
Margaret St. Clair at The FictionMags Index includes some unique bibliographic entries
Margaret St. Clair entry at Worlds Without End, includes a photo of the author

Works by Margaret St. Clair at Project Gutenberg
Margaret St. Clair at The Encyclopedia of Science Fiction online edition
More Authors of the Golden Age of Science Fiction: Margaret St. Clair, Part 1 and Part 2, posted June 25, 2103 at Tellers of Weird Tales 
"The Elusive Margaret St. Clair" by Andrew Liptak, posted at Kirkus Reviews, July 18, 2013
Reviews by Timothy Mayer of all eight novels by Margaret St. Clair and the three story collections published in her lifetime, and an article on collecting St. Clair ephemera
The Best of Margaret St. Clair review by Todd Mason
Change the Sky and Other Stories review by Ian Sales

20th-century American novelists
American science fiction writers
American women short story writers
American women novelists
Pseudonymous women writers
1911 births
1995 deaths
Women science fiction and fantasy writers
20th-century American women writers
20th-century American short story writers
People from El Sobrante, Contra Costa County, California
Weird fiction writers
20th-century pseudonymous writers